The Human Development Index (HDI) is a comparative measure of life expectancy, literacy, education and standards of living for countries worldwide. It is a standard means of measuring well-being, especially child welfare. It is used to distinguish whether the country is a developed, a developing or an under-developed country, and also to measure the impact of economic policies on quality of life. Countries fall into four broad categories based on their HDI: very high, high, medium, and low human development. Currently, no Oceanian country falls into the low human development category while Afghanistan and Pakistan and Yemen are the only Asian countries which fall into this category.

The index was developed in 1990 by Pakistani economist Mahbub ul Haq and Indian economist Amartya Sen.

List

The table below presents the latest Human Development Index (HDI) for countries in Asia and the Pacific as included in a Development report of united nations development programme released on 8 September 2022 and based on data collected in 2021.

Countries with contiguous boundaries that are partially (but not entirely) located in Asia are shown here in italics, but HDI figures are given for the whole country. Macao, North Korea, and Taiwan in Asia, as well as Nauru and Tuvalu in Oceania are not ranked as they are not included in the latest report by the United Nations Development Programme.

See also
Asia-Pacific Economic Cooperation
List of Asian and Pacific countries by GDP (PPP)
List of Asian countries by GDP
List of Asian countries by population
List of countries by Human Development Index
List of countries by Human Development Index by region
List of countries by industrial production growth rate
List of countries by percentage of population living in poverty

Notes

References

Asia and Oceania, Human Development Index
Asia-related lists
Oceania-related lists
Human Development